Jezik (lit. "Language") is a Croatian language literary magazine published in Croatia by the Croatian Philological Society since 1952. Its editors-in-chief have included Ljudevit Jonke and Stjepan Babić.

The magazine is known for its annual Dr. Ivan Šreter Award for the best neologism.

See also
 Croatian linguistic purism

References

Further reading
  (NSK). (FFZG).

External links 
 
 

Magazines established in 1952
Magazines published in Croatia
Croatian-language magazines
Literary magazines
1952 establishments in Yugoslavia
Magazines published in Yugoslavia